John Christopher Bartholomew (or J.C. Bartholomew) (15 January 1923 – 16 January 2008) was a Scottish cartographer and geographer.

Life

Bartholomew was the son of Marie Antoinette Sarolea, daughter of Charles Saroléa and John (Ian) Bartholomew (1890–1962). He was the great-great-grandson of the founder of John Bartholomew and Son Ltd.

He studied at Edinburgh Academy and Gordonstoun before taking a degree in geography at the University of Edinburgh.

He took over directorship of John Bartholomew & Co. from his father in 1951. At this stage Peter Bartholomew (1924-1987) was chairman and Robert Bartholomew (b.1927) was production manager. The company's most memorable production during their control was the Times Atlas (five volumes but also available in a 'concise' version). It also published the first metric versions of the large scale Ordnance Survey maps of the UK, aimed at hikers and travellers.

Bartholomew served as president of the British Cartographic Society in 1970–71. He was also a vice-president of the International Cartographic Association, 1972–80, and from 1987 to 1993, he was president of the Royal Scottish Geographical Society. He was active on the committee of the Scottish Rights of Way Society (now ScotWays), and was made its honorary president.

On his death he left monies to pay for view indicators on the summits of both Berwick Law and the Braid Hills.

He is buried against the north wall of the 20th-century extension to Dean Cemetery in western Edinburgh at the memorial to his grandfather, John George Bartholomew. His father Ian, and uncle Hugh lie with him.

Family

He married Ginette Achard-James. They had five sons: John Eric, Philip, Christopher, Patrick and Ivon.

See also
John Bartholomew and Son Ltd.

References

External links
Bartholomew: A Scottish Family Heritage - site maintained by the family.
Biography of J.C. Bartholomew at Collins Bartholomew
Times World Atlases official website including a History and Heritage section detailing landmark Times atlases

20th-century Scottish businesspeople
Scottish cartographers
Scottish geographers
Businesspeople from Edinburgh
People educated at Edinburgh Academy
People educated at Gordonstoun
Alumni of the University of Edinburgh
1923 births
2008 deaths
Presidents of the Royal Scottish Geographical Society
20th-century geographers
20th-century cartographers